Into the Land of Promise is the third studio album by Australian country, pop music trio, Karma County. The album was released in September 1999 and peaked at number 96 on the ARIA Charts.

At the ARIA Music Awards of 2000, the album won the ARIA Award for Best Adult Contemporary Album.

Track listing 
 "Secret Country" - 4:17
 "Everlovin' Laughter - 3:05
 "The Men Who Ran Away from the Circus" - 3:27
 "The Man That Midas Touched" - 3:15
 "On the Sacred Sand" - 2:52
 "Soliloquy" - 3:52
 "Watch Over Me" - 2:19
 "Lasoo" - 3:02
 "How Long" - 3:31
 "No Veil, No Heart" - 3:35
 "Mercy Sleep" - 3:32
 "Please God and the Weather" - 3:32

Charts

References 

1999 albums
ARIA Award-winning albums